KOUW (102.9 FM) is a radio station broadcasting a talk format. The station is licensed to serve the community of Island Park, Idaho, United States. The station is currently owned by Richard Mecham, through licensee Magic Valley Media, LLC, and features programming from Westwood One.

History
The station was assigned the callsign KEZQ on September 25, 1998. On November 30, 1998, the station changed its call sign to KWYS-FM, on February 24, 2012, to KOUW, on December 7, 2015, to KCHQ, and on December 23, 2015, back to KOUW.

Station back on-air
Though off-air for quite a while with issues ranging from signal strength to ice storm issues and lightning, as of Summer 2009, the station is on-air, 24 hours a day and at full-strength.

The station's coverage area is, as their slogan goes, from "Big Sky to Blackfoot" and it is one of very few stations available through the entirety of Yellowstone National Park and the only station most car scanners will stick on.

On September 9, 2016, KOUW switched to a simulcast of news/talk-formatted KID 590 AM Idaho Falls.

References

External links

OUW
News and talk radio stations in the United States
Radio stations established in 1999
1999 establishments in Idaho